The graminid clade is a clade of plants in the order Poales uniting four families, of which the grasses (Poaceae) are the most species-rich. Its sister group is the restiid clade.

References

Poales
Plant unranked clades